Longhai District is a District in Zhangzhou, in the south of Fujian province, China.

History
Following the revocation of the sea ban (haijin) in the late Ming, Yuegang (within present-day Haicheng in Longhai) became a key port for China's silver trade with Manila in the Spanish Philippines. It was one of Fujian's four main commercial ports.

It was formed from the merger of the former Longxi (Lungki) and Haicheng counties on August 15, 1960.

Geography 
Longhai located along the lower banks of the Jiulong River, with mountainous terrain in its western, southern, and northern portions, and the Xiamen Bay to its east. Longhai has three major river basins.

Climate

Administration

Longhai's main urban area comprises . The city's executive, legislature and judiciary are located there, along with the CPC and PSB branches.

Longhai administers 12 towns, 1 township, 1 ethnic township, 3 township-level farms, 2 township-level tree farms, and 1 development zones.

Towns

Townships

Ethnic townships 

Township-level farms
Longhai's 3 township-level farms are Shuangdi Overseas Chinese Farm, Chengxi Farm, and Longhai Seed Farm.

Township-level tree farms
Longhai's 2 township-level tree farms are Jiulongling Tree Farm and Linxia Tree Farm.

Development zones
Strictly speaking, the zone stands within the territory of one or another of the city-administered towns, townships, etc. listed above.

Demographics 
As of 2016, the city has a population of 736,400, of which, 241,000 (32.7%) live in urban areas. 50.55% of the population is reported as males, and 49.45% as females. 20.05% of the population is under the age of 18, 25.50% are from ages 18 to 35, 37.70% are from ages 35–60, and 16.75% are over 60 years in age.

Economy 
As of 2016, the city's gross domestic product totaled ¥45.768 billion, and the city's economy grew 9.3% from the previous year. The mean annual disposable income of the city's urban residents totaled ¥31,621 that same year, and totaled ¥16,101 for rural residents.

Companies with a presence in Longhai include Maxxis, China National Offshore Oil Corporation, King Long, Fujian Zishan Group, Haixin Group, and China Greenfresh.

Longhai has a number of mineral deposits, and is home to 147 mining areas. Major minerals mined in Longhai include granite, tuff, peat, feldspar, and kaolin. Significant amounts of mineral water is also extracted in the city.

Transportation

Longhai's only railway station is Zhangzhou Railway Station. It is the junction of two high-speed rail lines: the Longyan-Xiamen Railway (opened in June 2012) and the Xiamen-Shenzhen Railway (to open by 2013), which share their tracks from Zhangzhou to Xiamen.

The branch will be known as Gangwei Railway, and will support trains running at speeds up to 120 km/h. Its opening is planned for 2013.

The Zhangzhou Port tariff-free industrial export zone, is located in Gangwei.

Notable people 

 Corazon Aquino, the 11th President of the Philippines, traced her ancestry to the village of Hongjianwei, within Longhai.
 Lien Chan, a prominent Taiwanese politician, traces his ancestry to Longhai.

References

External links

 

 
Cities in Fujian
County-level divisions of Fujian
Zhangzhou